HDMS Thetis is a Thetis-class ocean patrol vessel belonging to the Royal Danish Navy.

In mid-1990s the ship served as a platform for seismic operations in the waters near Greenland. In 2002 she took over the role from her sister ship Hvidbjørnen as a platform for Commander Danish Task Group. The role was handed over to Absalon in September 2007.

February - April 2008 Thetis served as a protection against pirates for the World Food Programme chartered ships, carrying food aid, off the Horn of Africa. A squad of soldiers from the Frogman Corps was deployed aboard the ship.

In 2009 the ship served as staff ship for the NATO Mine Countermeasure Group 1.

References

External links

Thetis-class ocean patrol vessels
Ships built in Svendborg
1989 ships
Frigates of the Royal Danish Navy